Ghilianella is a genus of true bug in the subfamily Emesinae. Fifty-eight species have been described, with a distribution from Guatemala to Brazil.
The linear form of the species in this genus allow the young larvae to be carried about by the mother or perhaps the father. The larvae of the young can curl around the parent's thorax.

The genus can be recognized by the laterally acute prolonged apical last abdominal segments.

Partial species list
Ghilianella approximata
Ghilianella beckeri
Ghilianella borincana
Ghilianella mirabilis
Ghilianella phasma

References

External links
http://www.discoverlife.org/mp/20q?search=Reduviidae

Reduviidae
Cimicomorpha genera
Hemiptera of South America